The Battle of Gunnislake New Bridge was a battle that took place on 20 July 1644 on and around Gunnislake New Bridge, a bridge over the River Tamar between Cornwall and Devon, during the First English Civil War.

Background 
During the Civil War the county of Cornwall was entirely loyal to King Charles I and the Royalist cause. However, Devon was Parliamentarian, making the River Tamar the site of many battles. Each side understood that if they were to either invade the other county or defend against invasion, they had to have control of the Tamar's crossings. Gunnislake New Bridge was one of four bridges crossing the River Tamar.

Battle
The Parliamentarian forces, headed by Robert Devereux, 3rd Earl of Essex, pushed into Cornwall over the bridge. They were met by Richard Grenville's forces, who were quartered at the garrisons of Cotehele House and Harewood House, Calstock. The battle was hard fought and lasted all day. The Royalists prevented the Parliamentarians from advancing further into Cornwall, at a cost of 200 casualties and many taken prisoner. The Parliamentarians lost about 40 men.

Aftermath

After the battle both sides continued to defend their ends of the bridge. Lord Essex travelled north to Launceston, leaving half of his troops defending New Bridge. He then regrouped with his other forces based in the northern half of the Tamar Valley. On the 26th of July Essex crossed the Tamar at Horsebridge, penetrating the Royalist defences and continuing into the heart of Cornwall. This advance culminated in the Battle of Lostwithiel, a disastrous defeat for the Parliamentarians.

See also
Cornwall in the English Civil War

References

External links

 Calstock Online Parish Clerk
 Calstock History
 Cornwall Record Office Online Catalogue for Calstock
Calstock Parish Church History, Rev Gordon Ruming

1644 in England
17th century in Cornwall
Battles involving the Cornish
Battles of the English Civil Wars
Calstock
Conflicts in 1644
History of Cornwall
Military history of Cornwall
River Tamar
Southcott family